The surname Scales has more than one possible origin. 

In some cases, the surname may originate from a name for someone who lived near huts or sheds. In such cases, the surname is derived from the Middle English scale, schole, scole, meaning "(temporary) hut, shed, shieling" (from Old Scandinavian skáli). The surname may also originate from a specific place name of the same meaning, such as Scole (Norfolk), or from various other places called Scales or Scholes, mainly in northern England. The surname first appeared on record in Ireland, in Limerick, in the fourteenth century.  The surname can be rendered in Irish as de Scéalas.

In other cases, the surname Scales originates from a place name in France. In such cases, it is derived from Écalles-Alix in Seine-Maritime, or from Escalles in Pas-de-Calais.

People with the surname
 Baron Scales, a title in the Peerage of England, including a list of people named de Scales
 Alfred Moore Scales (1827–1892), Governor of North Carolina and Confederate Army general during the American Civil War
 Derek Percival Scales (born 1921), Australian literary scholar 
 Dwight Scales (born 1953), former National Football League wide receiver
 George Scales (1900–1976), American baseball player and manager in the Negro leagues
 Harvey Scales (1940–2019), American R&B and soul singer, songwriter, and producer
 Helen Scales, British marine biologist
 John Scales (born 1966), English former footballer
 John N. Scales (born 1933 or 1934), American former Pennsylvania state senator
 Junius Scales (1920–2002), a leader of the Communist Party of the United States of America
 Patrick Scales (American football) (born 1988), American football player
 Prunella Scales (born 1932), English actor best known for the television series Fawlty Towers
 Robert H. Scales (born 1944), retired US Army major general
 Sally Scales, South Australian artist, coordinator at the APY Art Centre Collective in Adelaide
 Tegray Scales (born 1996), American football player
 Thomas Scales (1786–1860), British abolitionist

Citations

References